Allan John Mummery (10 May 1916 – 16 February 1966) was an Australian rules footballer who played for the St Kilda Football Club in the Victorian Football League (VFL).

Death
He died at Woodend, Victoria on 16 February 1966.

Notes

External links 

1916 births
1966 deaths
Australian rules footballers from Victoria (Australia)
St Kilda Football Club players
Myrtleford Football Club players